Leroy Leon Pendarvis (born 1945) is an American session musician. He plays keyboards and is a background vocalist. He is also an occasional guitarist. The artists he has worked with over the years include Bonnie Raitt on her Streetlights album which was released in 1974, Van McCoy on his Disco Baby album which was released in 1975, Barbra Streisand on her Songbird album which was released in 1978, Eric Clapton on his August album which was released in 1986, Don Johnson on his Let It Roll album which was released in 1989, Avril Lavigne on her Keep Holding On album which was released on 2007, and many more. He was at one time a member of the group Passion. He is also the musical director and conductor for NBC's Saturday Night Live (SNL) Band, with which he has played since 1981. Since 1986 he has been a member of The Blues Brothers band. He was the husband of singer and chorist Janice Pendarvis (born Janice Gadsden), who sang for Roberta Flack, Sting, Philip Glass, David Bowie, and the Naked Brothers Band.

Background
The son of a first-grade primary school teacher, Pendarvis grew up in South Carolina. In addition to teaching, his mother was also pianist at their church. She also gave piano lessons to make extra money. The young Pendarvis graduated from climbing up on the bench to hit the keys to being taught by his mother. He also learned to play trumpet and saxophone. He also was a bass player when he came to New York.

He was married to Janice Pendarvis (formerly Janice Gadsden) whom he had known since she was 13. They married some time after she left her parents place and moved in with her cousin Andrew Gadsden who was Pendarvis's roommate.

He is also a board member for the Mesothelioma Applied Research Foundation. He was married to former Los Jovenes del Barrio singer Jillian,  (born Jill Maureen Armsbury) who died in January 2009 from mesothelioma.

Career

1970s
He played keyboards and provided the backing vocals for Richard Roundtree's 1972 album, The Man from Shaft.
Along with Janice Gadsden, he co-wrote "Sing a Happy Song" for Taj Mahal. He also produced the song which was released in 1978.

1980s
He composed, recorded and mixed the original dramatic music for the music video "BAD" by Michael Jackson.

2000s
By 2014, he had been with the Saturday Night Live Band, playing keyboards for 30 years and was the longest serving member with the outfit.
 
As of early 2018, Pendarvis was still the music director and band conductor for Saturday Night Live.

Along with guitarist Larry Campbell, and bass virtuoso Pino Palladino, Pendarvis played on the 2018 Bettye LaVette album Things Have Changed, an album of songs by Bob Dylan which was released on Verve Records.

Work with Van McCoy
Along with Richard Tee, Pendarvis played keyboards on the Van McCoy & the Soul City Symphony album, Love Is the Answer which was released on Avco Records in 1974. He also played clavinet and piano on their next album  Disco Baby, which contained the massive hit in 1975, "The Hustle". He played on McCoy's album The Disco Kid, which was released on Avco Records in 1975.

References

External links
 Discogs: Leon Pendarvis
 Imdb: Leon Pendarvis

Music directors
American music arrangers
20th-century American keyboardists
21st-century American musicians
African-American pianists
American organists
American male organists
1945 births
Living people
Saturday Night Live Band members
The Blues Brothers members
21st-century organists
21st-century American keyboardists
Date of birth missing (living people)